The Ladies Get Their Say is a 2009 Italian comedy-drama film  directed by Enzo Monteleone. It is based on the Cristina Comencini's stage play with the same name. It was nominated to four Silver Ribbon Awards (for best producer, best costumes, best set design, and to the whole cast for best supporting actresses) and to two David di Donatello (for best makeup and for best hairstyling).

Plot

Cast   
  
 Paola Cortellesi as Sofia
 Isabella Ferrari as  Beatrice
 Marina Massironi as  Claudia
 Margherita Buy as  Gabriella
 Claudia Pandolfi as  Rossana
 Alba Rohrwacher as  Giulia
 Valeria Milillo as  Cecilia
 Carolina Crescentini as  Sara

See also    
 List of Italian films of 2009

References

External links  

2009 comedy-drama films
2009 films
Italian comedy-drama films
2000s Italian films